Anabel is a Brazilian flash animated series created by Lancast Mota and produced by Sergio Martinelli. It was the first Brazilian animated series on Nickelodeon Brazil when it debuted on February 26, 2005 in the channel's Nick Patrol program. As of 2006 the show was exclusive to the channel TV Rá-Tim-Bum, where the second season premiered on February 5, 2011. The show also runs on TV Brasil.

A comic strip adaptation also ran in the children's magazine Recreio.

Premise
Set in the 1930s, the show revolves on a girl named Anabel, who lives with her unnamed parents in the city of Porto Alegre. She goes to school by riding the city's tramcars. Anabel also travels to fantastical and supernatural adventures from literary novels, encountering monsters and creatures. She also solves mysteries and stops dangers in the city.

The second season introduced the character Ulisses, who travels with Anabel in some episodes.

Characters

 Anabel – The 7-year-old protagonist of the show. She enjoys listening to radio dramas and reading fiction books from many authors including Edgar Allan Poe. She's named after the titular figure in Poe's poem "Annabel Lee."
 Anabel's parents – The protagonist's unnamed parents. The father is a pharmacist (cook in Season 2) and the mother is a history teacher.
 Ulisses – Anabel's best friend, who is overweight. His work and help to his friend sometimes fail.
 Theo - A magical crow and friend of Anabel and Ulysses. He is able to create gates to other worlds.
 Inspetor Carangueijo (Inspector Crab) – A detective based in Porto Alegre. He and Anabel cooperate to track down a toy thief in the episode "O Homem Fornalha."

Production
Lancast Mota devised and developed the concept of Anabel in the 1990s. He picked the 1930s as the time setting of the series due to its distinctive popular culture field placed apart from electronic-driven media of the present day, which includes television and video games. Mota and his team wanted the show to take advantage of creative elements not widely utilized in other animated works, including but not limited to strong literary themes and a lack of violence. Mota also avoided cliches seen in such other animated works, such as a "villain who wants to take over the world." The team made the protagonist motivated by non-visual media such as books and radio, which was prevalent in the 1930s.

The show was financed by the Rouanet Law and TV Cultura in 2000.

References

External links
 
 TV Rá-Tim-Bum description
 Character page
 Martinelli webpage
 TV Brasil page

2000s animated television series
2010s animated television series
2005 Brazilian television series debuts
2011 Brazilian television series endings
2000s black comedy television series
Brazilian children's animated comedy television series
Brazilian children's animated fantasy television series
Brazilian flash animated television series
Television series set in the 1930s
Television shows set in Brazil
Portuguese-language Nickelodeon original programming
Animated television series about children